Jörgen Persson can refer to:

 Jörgen Persson, Swedish table tennis player
 Jörgen Persson (footballer who played for Malmö FF in 1993), Swedish footballer
 Jörgen Persson (footballer who played for Malmö FF in 1989), Swedish footballer
 Jörgen Persson (cinematographer), Swedish cinematographer